Ernest Charles Roche (February 4, 1930 – January 2, 1988) was a Canadian professional ice hockey defenceman who played four games in the National Hockey League for the Montreal Canadiens.

External links

1930 births
1988 deaths
Buffalo Bisons (AHL) players
Canadian expatriate ice hockey players in the United States
Canadian ice hockey defencemen
Cincinnati Mohawks (AHL) players
Milwaukee Falcons players
Montreal Canadiens players
Montreal Junior Canadiens players
Ice hockey people from Montreal
Springfield Indians players
Victoria Cougars (1949–1961) players